Masahito Suzuki may refer to:

, Japanese ice hockey player
, Japanese footballer